Eliecith Palacios Santos (born 15 September 1987 in Carepa, Antioquia) is a Colombian sprinter.

Career
She competed for the Colombian team in the 4 × 100 metres relay at the 2012 Summer Olympics; the team placed 11th with a time of 43.21 in Round 1 and did not qualify for the final.

Personal bests
100 m: 11.21 (wind: +0.7 m/s) –  Medellín, 10 July 2016
200 m: 24.31 (wind: +1.1 m/s) –  Ponce, 16 April 2011
100 m hurdles: 13.15 (wind: +0.4 m/s) –  Barquisimeto, 9 June 2012

International competitions

References

External links

Tilastopaja biography

1987 births
Living people
Colombian female sprinters
Olympic athletes of Colombia
Athletes (track and field) at the 2012 Summer Olympics
Athletes (track and field) at the 2016 Summer Olympics
South American Games bronze medalists for Colombia
South American Games medalists in athletics
Competitors at the 2014 South American Games
Central American and Caribbean Games gold medalists for Colombia
Central American and Caribbean Games silver medalists for Colombia
Competitors at the 2010 Central American and Caribbean Games
Competitors at the 2014 Central American and Caribbean Games
Competitors at the 2018 Central American and Caribbean Games
Central American and Caribbean Games medalists in athletics
Athletes (track and field) at the 2011 Pan American Games
Pan American Games competitors for Colombia
Olympic female sprinters
Sportspeople from Antioquia Department
20th-century Colombian women
21st-century Colombian women